Sebastian Mrowca (born 16 January 1994) is a Polish professional footballer who plays as a defensive midfielder for SV Wehen Wiesbaden. Born and raised in Germany, he also holds German citizenship.

Club career

Bayern Munich
Mrowca joined the youth ranks of German record champion Bayern Munich at the age of ten in 2004. Later he even became captain of their U19 team. During the 2012–13 Regionalliga season he was promoted to their second senior team. He didn't make any appearance but was on the bench for three times.

Energie Cottbus
In June 2013, Mrowca signed for FC Energie Cottbus on a three-year deal until 2016. He made his 2. Bundesliga debut in the first game of the 2013–14 season at 22 July 2013 against Fortuna Düsseldorf.

Wehen Wiesbaden
He left Cottbus after one season and signed a two-year contract with 3. Liga side SV Wehen Wiesbaden in the Hessian capital.

References

External links
 

Living people
1994 births
People from Miesbach (district)
Sportspeople from Upper Bavaria
German people of Polish descent
Polish footballers
German footballers
Footballers from Bavaria
Association football midfielders
Poland youth international footballers
FC Bayern Munich II players
FC Energie Cottbus II players
FC Energie Cottbus players
SV Wehen Wiesbaden players
2. Bundesliga players
3. Liga players